The 1993 Ohio Bobcats football team was an American football team that represented Ohio University in the Mid-American Conference (MAC) during the 1993 NCAA Division I-A football season. In their fourth season under head coach Tom Lichtenberg, the Bobcats compiled a 4–7 record (4–5 against MAC opponents), finished in sixth place in the MAC, and were outscored by all opponents by a combined total of 282 to 134.  They played their home games in Peden Stadium in Athens, Ohio.

Schedule

References

Ohio
Ohio Bobcats football seasons
Ohio Bobcats football